Malhar Ragang and all other ragas falling under this category are ragas in the Hindustani Classical music. Ragang refers to a family of ragas sharing a common melodic kernel.
Other similar raga families are the Sarang family and the Kanada family. The Malhar ragas are generally sung in the Rainy season. The word Malhar is associated with torrential rains.

The unique phrase that categorises the Malhar family from others is m (m)R (m)R P, this is the Malhar signature phrase.

History

According to legends, Malhar is so powerful that when sung, it can induce rainfall. Many written accounts describe the Raga Malhar. Tansen, Baiju Bawra, Baba Ramdas, Nayak Charju, Miyan Bakhshu, Tanta rang, Tantras Khan, Bilas Khan (son of Tansen), Hammer Sen, Surat Sen, and Meera Bai are some of those said to be capable of starting rains using various kinds of raga Malhar.

It is said that raga Miyan ki Malhar was created by Miyan Tansen.

List of ragas in the Malhar family
Following is the list of the ragas in the Malhar Family :

 Adana Malhar 
 Anand Malhar (first sung by GaanSaraswati Vidushi Kishori Amonkar)
 Arun Malhar
 Bahar Malhar
 Barwa Malhar
 Basanti Malhar (mixture of ragas Basant and Gaud Malhar)
 Bilawal Malhar (mixture of ragas Alhaiya Bilawal and Gaud Malhar)
 Birju ki Malhar
 Chandani Malhar
 Charju Ki Malhar
 Chhaya Malhar
 Desh Malhar
 Dhulia Malhar
 Gandhi Malhar (sang by Pandit Kumar Gandharva)
 Gaud Malhar
 Gaudgiri Malhar (sang by Pandit Jasraj)
 Jayant Malhar
 Jhinjhoti Malhar (sang by Dr. Sunita Saxena)
 Kafi Malhar
 Kedar Malhar/Savani Kedar (sang by Vidushi Ashwini Bhide-Deshpande)
 Malhar/Miyan Ki Malhar
 Meerabai Ki Malhar
 Megh Malhar
 Mod Malhar (mixture of Kamod and Miyan Ki Malhar)
 Nanak Malhar 
 Nat Malhar 
 Pat Malhar 
 Ramdasi Malhar
 Sarang Malhar/Miyan Ki Sarang 
 Sawan Gandhar (sang by GaanSaraswati Vidushi Kishori Amonkar)
 Shahana Malhar
 Shiv Malhar (mixture of ragas Shivaranjani and Miyan Ki Malhar)
 Shuddha Malhar
 Sorath Malhar 
 Sur Malhar 
 Surdasi Malhar
 Tilak Malhar

See also
 Malhar
 List of Ragas in Hindustani classical music
 Kanada (family of ragas)
 Sarang (family of ragas)

References

Indian classical music
Ragas
Hindustani music
Hindustani language
Hindustani music genres